Calling „Helga!“ is a running gag at German concerts and festivals.

Ritual
A person may call for a Helga, others answer and come to a chorus like group effect. „Helga ist tot!“ (Helga is dead) denies the helgaing request. Further allegations are gravestones, memorials or graffiti. The background is unknown, some reports point to a rather rainy Hurricane Festival in Scheeßel, where a high pressure cyclone called Helga was called for but didn't arrive in time. The call was namegiver for an annual prize for German festivals. and is being  used by a service company.

References 

Running gags
German culture
Festivals in Germany